Pattanam is a village located in the Ernakulam District in the southern Indian state of Kerala. It is located 2 km north of North Paravur, 6 km  and East of Chendamangalam 25 km north of Kochi (Cochin).

History
A branch of the Kanjirapuzha, called the Kanjirapuzha Thodu (Kanjirapuzha canal), runs close to Pattanam. Satellite imagery, a clear geological evidence, indicated that the old name of Pattanam is Pashnam.
Moreover, the residents of Pattanam regularly used to find a large amount of broken pottery shards and ancient fired bricks while digging the ground. The Pattanam old name is Pashnam.And the junction of Pattanam is called Pashnam kavala.

Archaeological excavations
The site for archaeological research at Pattanam  (10°09.434’N; 76°12.587’E) covers about 45 hectares. Due to habitation activities it is a "disturbed" site; some parts are partially destroyed due to sand quarrying.

The multi-disciplinary and multi-seasonal archaeological research at Pattanam from 2007 undertaken by the Kerala Council for Historical Research (KCHR) is a pioneering initiative in the history of Kerala Archaeology.

Square copper coins (on one side an elephant and on the other bows and arrows) had been found at the site. These types of coins were issued in the beginning of Christian era. At the same time there is lack of evidence to show that the artifacts unearthed at Pattanam came specifically from Rome. It is necessary to get information that these are connected directly to Italy.

Excavated antiquities include Chera coins, Amphora, Terra Sigillatta, Cameo Blanks made of semi-precious stones and stone and glass beads in large quantity. Remains of brick structures made of burned bricks were also found there.  A wharf context with a six m dugout canoe made of anjili wood and bollards made of teak wood and a large quantity of botanical remains were found.

Excavations 2010
Findings: Antiquities of small size - beads of both semi-precious stones and glass, pendants or lockets  cameo blanks, coins, (predominantly early Chera coins, with symbols of elephant, bow and arrow) objects or fragments of objects made of iron, copper, lead and rarely gold, and sherds of Indian and foreign pottery.  
A broken rim with Tamil Brahmi script. This is the first pre-firing pottery inscription finding at Pattanam.
Enormous quantity of local pottery of the early Historic Period, which is dated between first century BC and fourth century AD, showing that this was the peak activity stage of Pattanam.

Excavations 2011
The excavations at Pattanam sheds new light on the life and times of the ancient Kerala. The finds this year include iron and copper nails, Roman glass, Chola coins, terracotta and semi precious stone beads.

Criticisms
Former Director of the Tamil Nadu State Archaeology Department R. Nagaswamy is of opinion that it is not yet time to identify Pattanam as Muziris. Kodungallur also is to be excavated before coming to a conclusion. Archaeology requires a lot of evidence before arriving at any conclusion. Romila Thapar has expressed her reservations on the use of ancient DNA sampling techniques, raising doubts whether there was the danger of bacterial contaminations or mutations in samples taken from skeletons that were buried for over 2,000 years. She however describes Pattanam as "a turning point for studies into India’s maritime relations.". Historian M.G.S. Narayanan says that Pattanam is not Muziris and that Muziris is Kodungallur. The second Chera dynasty  ruled was kodungallur.  The Jewish copper plate inscriptions of 1000 AD says that Kodungallur is Muyirikkode. Muyirikkode is another name of Muziris. According to him, it is the clear evidence that Kodungallur is Muziris. 

The identification of Pattanam as Muziris is a divisive subject among some of the historians of south India. "Whether Pattanam was Muziris is not of immediate concern to us," the chief of the Kerala Council for Historical Research recently stated to the media. Even the last field report on the excavations (2013) explicitly shows Pattanam as Muziris.

See also
List of archaeological sites by country
North Paravur
Thiruvanchikulam
Ernakulam District
Paravur Taluk
Kochi
Kodungallur

References

Resources
BBC report, Search for India's ancient city
Pattanam Excavations (Comprehensive Resource)
Pattanam excavation significant

Archaeological sites in Kerala
Tourist attractions in Ernakulam district
Villages in Ernakulam district